The Nationalist Union of the People (Spanish: Unión Nacionalista del Pueblo, UNP) was a right-wing, pro-military electoral political alliance in Bolivia.

The UNP was formed in January 1978 by:
 Bolivian Socialist Falange, FSB (right-wing pro-military faction led by Gastón Moreira Ostria)
 Nationalist Revolutionary Movement, MNR (pro-military faction led by Rubén Julio Castro)
 Authentic Revolutionary Party, PRA (pro-military faction led by Jorge Ríos Gamarra)
 Committee of National Unity, CUN
 Popular Christian Movement, MPC
 Liberal Party, PL
 Barrientista National Union, UNB
 Republican Socialist Unity Party, PURS
 Social Christian Party, PSC.

It presented as its presidential candidate Juan Pereda Asbún (independent) and Alfredo Franco Guachalla (MNR), as vice-presidential candidate.

Notes

1978 establishments in Bolivia
Defunct political party alliances in Bolivia
Political parties established in 1978
Political parties with year of disestablishment missing
Revolutionary Nationalist Movement
Right-wing parties in South America